Vinogradov or Vinogradoff is a common Russian last name derived from the Russian word виноград (vinograd, meaning "grape" and виноградник vinogradnik, meaning "vineyard"). Vinogradova is a feminine version of the same name. Notable people with the surname include:

 Aleksandr Vinogradov (writer) (1930–2011), a Russian writer
 Aleksandr Vinogradov (canoeist) (born 1951), Russian sprint canoer
 Alexandre Mikhailovich Vinogradov (1938-2019),  Russian and Italian mathematician
 Alexander Vinogradov (geochemist), (1895–1975), Soviet geochemist, academician
 Alexander Vinogradov (bass) (born 1976), a Russian bass opera singer
 Alexandra Vinogradova (born 1988), Russian volleyballer
 Alexei Vinogradov (1899–1940), a Soviet World War II brigade commander
 Anton Vinogradov (born 1973), a Russian voice actor
 Askold Vinogradov (1929–2005), a Russian mathematician
 Dagnis Vinogradovs (born 1981), Latvia flatwater canoer 
 Dmitry Vinogradov (1720–1758), a Russian scientist, inventor of porcelain
 Ekaterina Vinogradova (born 1977), Russian biathlete and cross-country skier.
 Georgi Vinogradov (1908–1980), a Russian tenor
 Ivan Vinogradov (1891–1983), a Russian mathematician
 Maria Vinogradova (1922–1995), Russian actress
 Nadezhda Vinogradova (born 1958), Soviet Union heptathlete 
 Nikolai Vinogradov (1905–1979), Soviet naval officer
 Nikolay Vinogradov (born 1947), the governor of Vladimir Oblast
 Olga Vinogradova, (1929–2001), Russian neurophysiologist
 Paul Vinogradoff (1854–1925), a Russian historian
 Pavel Vinogradov (born 1953), a Russian cosmonaut
 Sergei Vinogradov (footballer, born 1981) (born 1981), a Russian soccer player
 Sergei Vinogradov (journalist) (1958–2010), Russian author, journalist and translator
 Vasili Vinogradov (1874–1948), a Russian Tatar opera composer, violinist and pedagogue
 Vera Vinogradova (1895-1982) Soviet composer and pianist
 Viktor Vinogradov (1894–1969), a Russian linguist, literary critic, and academician
 Vladimir Vinogradov (1955–2008), a Russian businessman, the President of Inkombank
 Vladimir Vinogradov (diplomat) (1921–1997), a Soviet diplomat
 Vladislav Vinogradov (1899–1962), general
 Yekaterina Vinogradova (born 1980), Russian swimmer
 Yelena Vinogradova (born 1964), a Russian sprinter

See also
 Winograd, surname

Russian-language surnames